Sergey Bykovsky (born May 30, 1972) is a boxer from Belarus, who won the bronze medal in the Men's Light Welterweight (– 63.5 kg) division at the 1996 European Amateur Boxing Championships in Vejle, Denmark, alongside Bulgaria's Radoslav Suslekov.

Bykovsky represented his native country at two consecutive Summer Olympics, starting in 1996 in Atlanta, United States. There he was stopped in the second round of the Men's Light-Welterweight division by France's Nordine Mouichi. He failed to qualify for the 2004 Summer Olympics, finishing in third place at the 3rd AIBA European 2004 Olympic Qualifying Tournament in Gothenburg, Sweden.

References
 sports-reference

1972 births
Living people
Sportspeople from Vitebsk
Light-welterweight boxers
Boxers at the 1996 Summer Olympics
Boxers at the 2000 Summer Olympics
Olympic boxers of Belarus
Belarusian male boxers